Emerald Downs is a Thoroughbred racetrack in Auburn, Washington, located a half mile east of Highway 167. It is named after Seattle, the Emerald City.

History
Emerald Downs first opened its doors to race fans on June 20, 1996, with the inaugural 100-day meet running through November 4. It replaced Longacres Racetrack, which closed in September 1992 after sixty seasons of racing. Following the closure of Longacres, racing was not held in Western Washington from 1993–1995. However, Thoroughbred racing continued at Yakima Meadows and Playfair Race Course in Spokane during this time. Emerald Downs operated as a Limited Partnership from 1996 to 2015, with a group of investors led by Ron Crockett. In 2002, the land where Emerald Downs is situated was purchased by the Muckleshoot Indian Tribe for roughly $70 million.  The Tribe purchased the track buildings and facilities and formed Emerald Downs Racing LLC in 2015.  The Tribe has made a number of improvements since taking over the operation including a  infield big screen.  Emerald Downs celebrated its 20th anniversary Monday, June 20, 2016, with a special night of racing featuring many of the stars from the track's first two decades.

Physical attributes

The Track
The Emerald Downs track is a one-mile (1.6 km) oval in the shadow of Mount Rainier. The track surface itself is made of geo-textile fabric, washed rock, coarse sand, and one-component track material. However, there is no turf course. The tote board is located in the center of the oval track.

The Emerald Downs infield is designed as a storm system that is sized to accommodate all storm runoff for the entire southern portion of the track property, including all rooftop surfaces as well as parking lots and the racetrack surface. Before releasing any water, Emerald Downs tests for turbidity and PH levels. Samples are also sent to a laboratory for further testing of dissolved oxygen, ammonia and fecal coliform levels. Finally, the water is released into Mill Creek at an engineered rate of discharge in order to help prevent flooding downstream from the track. Much of the infield is under water during the fall and winter, creating a home for ducks, geese, and other small wildlife.

The grandstand

The Emerald Downs Grandstand is a modern racetrack facility designed by EwingCole. There is general admission seating on track level, including a grassy park area with free children's activities on weekends (weather permitting). Outside on the third floor are box and reserved seats in the grandstand, as well as box and reserved seats on the fifth floor indoor clubhouse.

Pari-mutuel windows are located on each floor to place wagers. There are eight food stands and six beverage services throughout the facility.

Barn area
Each of the 11 barns is a complete facility for horsemen with: 116 stalls; 22 tack and feed storage areas; six trainer offices; 12 hay and straw storage areas; 10 wash racks; 13 dorm rooms for grooms and six mechanical hot walkers. For the horse's protection, each stall is padded with plywood wainscot kick-boards.

Sales pavilion
The Morris J. Alhadeff Sales Pavilion is the home for the Washington Thoroughbred Breeders Association. The $1 million facility opened to the public on December 14, 1997, for the 1997 Winter Sale. It was funded by significant donations from Micheal and Kenneth Alhadeff and other industry members.

Paddock and saddling area

Beside the grandstand is a paddock and covered horse saddling area. Paved surfaces around the paddock and up to the saddling area provide spectators an opportunity to view the horses when the horses are in these areas. Prior to the start of each race, horses are walked through the paddock into the saddling area, walked around the saddling area a few times and their saddles put on. Once the horses are saddled, they are walked once around the paddock before the jockey mounts the horse and the horses are walked out to the race track.

Equine hospital
Funded jointly by Northwest Racing Associates, track veterinarians, the families of Mike and Ken Alhadeff and private contributors, the Morris J. Alhadeff Equine Hospital is a state-of-the-art facility used by the Emerald Downs Veterinary Association. The vet clinic includes:

 Surgery suite
 Two padded induction/recovery rooms
 Radiology room
 Prep room for minor procedures
 Isolation stall (for contagious ailments)
 Dark room for film developing
 Office space

Mitigation site
As part of the process in building the facility that exists today, Northwest Racing Associates, L.P. developed an extensive plan to mitigate the impact of a fill on low grade wetlands on the Emerald Downs property. Located a mile and one-half south of the track property, at a cost of $6.5 million,  of wetlands were created or enhanced. On the east side of SR-167, 100,000 cubic yards of soil were excavated, creating  of open water. Habitat features were added to benefit water fowl, birds of prey and mammals.

Washington Racing Hall of Fame

The Washington Horse Racing Hall of Fame is housed on the track level of the grandstand. Inductees are recognized for their accomplishments in five main categories: jockeys, trainers, horses, breeders, or lifetime achievement. The inductees for each class, year, of inductees are determined by a combination of the media, Emerald Downs, the Washington Thoroughbred Breeders and Owners Association, and the National Horsemen's Benevolent and Protective Association. Emerald Downs shares videos highlighting various hall of fame inductees and their induction ceremony on its YouTube channel.

A number of individuals inducted into this hall of fame have also been recognized at the Washington state level for sports excellence and are inductees in the State of Washington Sports Hall of Fame as well. These individuals include Basil James, Joe Gottstein, Russell Baze, and Albert Johnson.

Racing
Emerald Downs hosts live Thoroughbred racing during the spring and summer. The 2022 racing season began on Sunday, May 15 and will conclude on Sunday, September 18. Races are run Friday through Sunday the majority of the season. The track conducts several large ungraded stakes (i.e. the Auburn Handicap) and many overnight handicaps and stakes. There are an average of 7-8 races on weeknights, and 10 races per race weekend. In addition to live racing, the track offers simulcast wagering and a card room casino year round.

The first Quarter Horse race in track history was held in 2010. In 2011, Emerald Downs added a major Quarter Horse stakes, the $60,000 Bank of America Emerald Championship Challenge Stakes run on Labor Day weekend.

Emerald Downs also hosted Indian Relay Racing in 2015 and the popular feature returned June 8–10, 2018.

Graded events
The following Graded events were held at Emerald Downs in 2019.

Grade III:
 Longacres Mile

Jockeys
Gallyn Mitchell is the all-time leading rider at Emerald Downs with 1,419 wins through the 2015 racing season and the only jockey to have raced at every meet since Emerald Downs opened in 1996. Jennifer Whitaker is the all-time leading female rider with 457 wins. Ricky Frazier set records for wins in a season (157) and earnings ($1,632,102) in 2007. Frazier won the riding title again in 2009 with 155 victories and $1,492,455 in earnings. Vann Belvoir owns the best winning percentage in track history at 23.9%. The track record for wins in a single day is six, shared by Seth Martinez (July 27, 2008) and Kevin Radke (September 2, 2002). Eliska Kubinova set a record for wins by an apprentice with 75 victories in 2012.

Many famous jockeys have ridden at Emerald Downs, including several members of the Thoroughbred Racing Hall of Fame. Laffit Pincay Jr., Pat Day, Eddie Delahoussaye, Russell Baze, Gary Stevens, Alex Solis, Garrett Gomez, David Flores, Robby Albarado and Gary Baze have all competed on the Emerald Downs oval.

Trainers
Washington Hall of Fame trainer Tim McCanna is the all-time leader at Emerald Downs with 906 wins through 2015 and has won 10 training titles since the inaugural season of 1996. McCanna set a track record with 66 wins in 2008, a mark that Jeff Metz tied with 66 wins in 2015. Since arriving from California in 2013, Metz has reeled off three straight training titles with 42, 49 and 66 wins. Washington Hall of Fame Trainer Jim Penney remains one of the most accomplished trainers in state history. His five career wins in the Longacres Mile (three at Emerald Downs) ranks best of all time. He is also the only trainer in Washington State history to win five races in a single day twice. Doris Harwood is the only other trainer to accomplish the feat a single time, collecting five wins on August 8, 2009. Penney's 50 career stakes wins rank second all-time and he also earned a training title at Emerald Downs in 1998 when he led all conditioners with 46 wins. Doris Harwood set a record for earnings in a single season with $931,916 in 2009. She also won 12 stakes in 2009, tying a track record she set in 2007, and is No. 1 all-time with 66 stakes wins at Emerald Downs.

Owners

Horses
Wasserman is the track's all-time leading earner, with $575,024 in purses thru the 2015 season. West Seattle Boy is the winningest horse in track history with 21 career trips to the winner's circle, the most recent on September 25, 2011 as a 12-year-old. Noosa Beach leads in career stakes victories with 11. In 2005, Halonator set the track record for wins in a season with 8. In 2015, Jim & Mona Hour's 6-year-old Washington-bred Stryker Phd became the first horse to win the Longacres Mile twice at Emerald Downs.

Career wins

Horse of the Meeting

Speed records

Note: (QH) = Quarter Horse

Longacres Mile
Emerald Downs biggest race is the Longacres Mile Handicap, a Grade III event. The race was announced in June 1935 so Longacres founder Joe Gottstein could have a signature one mile (1.6 km) race. He felt the mile was an overlooked distance, neither a sprint nor an endurance run. In order to attract racers and attention, the purse was set at $10,000, instantly the largest staked one mile (1.6 km) race in the country (and it would remain so for more than 40 years).

As soon as the announcement was made, the first running of the race had 20 entrants; 16 actually started. The stakes attracted the owners of a New Orleans horse named Biff, grandson of Man o' War, who had just won $5000 in Chicago. Biff had the attention of everyone for weeks before the event and no owners would run their horses in preliminary races with him. Biff was first out of the gate but was stalked by Coldwater, a 20-1 longshot that wasn't regarded well. Near the end of the mile Biff was showing clear strain and Coldwater overtook him to win.

In 2008, locally owned and bred Wasserman took the Longacres Mile closing fast to win in a photo finish over horses shipped in to run the race. The 75th Longacres Mile was run on August 22, 2010. It was won by the betting favorite, Noosa Beach. Ridden by Ricky Frazier and trained by Doris Harwood for owner Jeff Harwood, the winner paid $5.60, $3.80 and $3.00. Jersey Town finished second, followed by the 2009 Mile champion, Assessment.

The 2011 Longacres Mile featured a showdown between defending champion Noosa Beach and multiple graded stakes-winning millionaire Awesome Gem. Awesome Gem took the lead near the wire, defeating Noosa Beach by 1 1/2 lengths. It was his 9th win in 46 career starts, boosting his earnings to over $2.6 Million. In 2012, jockey Mario Gutierrez became the first rider to sweep the Kentucky Derby and Longacres Mile in the same year, guiding I'll Have Another to wins in the Kentucky Derby and Preakness Stakes, and then taking the Mile aboard Canadian shipper Taylor Said.

In 2014-2015, Stryker Phd became the first horse to win the Longacres Mile in consecutive years at Emerald Downs. The 6-year-old Washington-bred gelding by Bertrando-Striking Scholar is owned by Jim and Mona Hour of Bellevue, Wash., trained by Larry Ross and ridden by Leslie Mawing.

Emerald Downs selected other races and inaugural date:
Cahill Road Stakes (1951)
Emerald Distaff (1996)
Emerald Downs Derby (1934)
Gottstein Futurity (1940)
Governor's Handicap (1933)
Muckleshoot Tribal Classic (1942)
Seattle Stakes (1934)
Seattle Slew Handicap (1977)
Washington Oaks (1980)

Washington Cup races:
 Washington Cup 2yo Colts & Geldings Stakes
 Washington Cup 2yo Filly Stakes
 Washington Cup 3yo Filly Stakes
 Washington Cup 3yo Filly & Mare Stakes
 Washington Cup 3yo Stakes

Emerald Downs Mutuel Payoff records

Highest $2 Win payoffs

Highest $2 Place payoffs

Highest $2 Show payoffs
The massive payoffs for the top three horses listed were a result of a fourth-place finish by then-undefeated Knight Raider in the Diane Kem Stakes for two-year-old fillies on Washington Cup Day. $148,000 of the $156,000 pool was put on Knight Raider, providing huge payoffs for the top three finishers when she finished out of the money.

Highest $2 Daily Double

Highest $1 Exacta payoffs

Highest $1 Trifecta payoffs

Highest $1 Pick Three

Highest $1 Pick Four

Note: The Pick Four was changed to a $0.50 minimum wager in 2010.

Highest $2 Pick Six

Highest $1 Superfectas

References

 
1996 establishments in Washington (state)
Buildings and structures in Auburn, Washington
Horse racing venues in Washington (state)
Sports venues in Washington (state)
Tourist attractions in King County, Washington